The 2002–03 Cypriot Second Division was the 47th season of the Cypriot second-level football league. Nea Salamina won their 3rd title.

Format
Fourteen teams participated in the 2001–02 Cypriot Second Division. All teams played against each other twice, once at their home and once away. The team with the most points at the end of the season crowned champions. The first three teams were promoted to 2002–03 Cypriot First Division and the last three teams were relegated to the 2002–03 Cypriot Third Division.

Changes from previous season
Teams promoted to 2001–02 Cypriot First Division
 Alki Larnaca
 Ethnikos Assia
 Ermis Aradippou

Teams relegated from 2000–01 Cypriot First Division
 Nea Salamina
 Digenis Morphou
 Aris Limassol

Teams promoted from 2000–01 Cypriot Third Division
 ASIL Lysi
 Adonis Idaliou
 Enosis Kokkinotrimithia

Teams relegated to 2001–02 Cypriot Third Division
 Kinyras Empas
 Rotsidis Mammari
 AEK/Achilleas Ayiou Theraponta

League standings

Results

See also
 Cypriot Second Division
 2001–02 Cypriot First Division
 2001–02 Cypriot Cup

Sources

Cypriot Second Division seasons
Cyprus
2001–02 in Cypriot football